Matteo Giordano (born 23 October 1984) is an Italian footballer who plays as a defender.

Career
Born in Sanremo, Liguria region, Matteo Giordano started his career at Torino Calcio, then A.C. Milan, Lombardy and played on their Primavera Team.

In summer 2003, he was involved a swap deal with F.C. Internazionale Milano, in which Giordano, Ronny Diuk Toma, Simone Brunelli and Matteo Deinite moved to Internazionale, while Salvatore Ferraro, Alessandro Livi, Giuseppe Ticli and Marco Varaldi moved to A.C. Milan. Later, the deal was criticized by the press as making false profit on the balance sheet, as the transfer fees were paid via player exchange, but in the balance sheet, the nominal value could be adjusted by two clubs. The tactic is commonly used to make the transfer fees larger in Italian football.

He then left on loan to Castel di Sangro, A.C. Montichiari and Olbia at Serie C2, and Lugano at Swiss Challenge League.

In June 2007, the co-ownership agreement ended with Inter fully contracted with Giordano, but he was released to join hometown club Sanremese of Serie D.

References

External links
 
 Profile at Calciatori.com/

1984 births
Living people
People from Sanremo
Italian footballers
Italian expatriate footballers
Swiss Challenge League players
Torino F.C. players
A.C. Milan players
FC Lugano players
A.C. Montichiari players
S.S.D. Sanremese Calcio players
Association football defenders
Expatriate footballers in Switzerland
Italian expatriate sportspeople in Switzerland
Sportspeople from the Province of Imperia
Footballers from Liguria